Edmund Leavens Chandler (December 21, 1829 – August 21, 1880) was a Canadian merchant and a political figure in Quebec. He represented Brome in the House of Commons of Canada from 1879 to 1880 as a Liberal member.

He was born in Frelighsburg, Missisquoi County, Lower Canada, the son of Horace Mitchell and Lydia Leavens. After completing his education, Chandler taught school for several years and then worked as a secretary for realty dealers in Lowell, Massachusetts for about five years. In 1855, he settled at Brome Corner (later Brome) in Canada East and entered business there as a general merchant with Henry Rogers. Chandler also served as secretary-treasurer for the Brome County council and chairman of Brome township's board of school commissioners. In 1860, he married Amanda Jane Darling. Chandler was mayor of Brome township and warden of Brome County from 1868 to 1872. He helped promote the development of the South-Eastern Railway, later bought by the Canadian Pacific Railway, and served as its secretary-treasurer. Chandler died in office at Brome Corner at the age of 50.

References

External links 
 

1829 births
1880 deaths
Members of the House of Commons of Canada from Quebec
Liberal Party of Canada MPs
Mayors of places in Quebec